Leroy-Jacques Mickels (born 25 June 1995) is a German professional footballer who plays as a forward for Spartak Varna.

Career
Mickels moved to MSV Duisburg on 27 June 2019. He made his professional debut for MSV Duisburg in the 3. Liga on 20 July 2019, in the home match against Sonnenhof Großaspach. His contract was extended until 2021 on 18 December 2019. On 26 May 2021, it was announced that he would leave Duisburg at the end of the 2020–21 season. Four days later, he signed with Türkgücü München.

Mickels joined Regionalliga West club Rot-Weiß Oberhausen on 23 June 2022. He signed a one-and-a-half year contract with Bulgarian club Spartak Varna in January 2023.

Personal life
Born in Germany, Mickels is of Congolese descent.

Career statistics

References

External links

1995 births
Living people
People from Siegburg
Sportspeople from Cologne (region)
German footballers
German sportspeople of Democratic Republic of the Congo descent
Association football forwards
Borussia Mönchengladbach II players
FC St. Pauli II players
Alemannia Aachen players
SSVg Velbert players
MSV Duisburg players
Türkgücü München players
Rot-Weiß Oberhausen players
PFC Spartak Varna players
3. Liga players
Regionalliga players
Oberliga (football) players
Footballers from North Rhine-Westphalia